Tuberculosis cutis orificialis (also known as "acute tuberculous ulcer") is a form of cutaneous tuberculosis that occurs at the mucocutaneous borders of the nose, mouth, anus, urinary meatus, and vagina, and on the mucous membrane of the mouth or tongue.

See also 
 Scrofuloderma
 Skin lesion
 List of cutaneous conditions

References 

Mycobacterium-related cutaneous conditions